Walter Grüter (born 9 January 1954) is a Swiss football manager. Grüter is currently working as Fitness coach for Grasshopper Club Zürich.

References

1954 births
Living people
Sportspeople from Zürich
Swiss football managers
Grasshopper Club Zürich non-playing staff
FC Winterthur managers
FC Zürich managers
FC Concordia Basel managers
FC Luzern non-playing staff
FC Basel non-playing staff
Swiss expatriate football managers
Swiss expatriate sportspeople in Turkey
Swiss expatriate sportspeople in Russia
FC Zürich non-playing staff